Juan Aguilera Araneda (23 October 1903-21 October 1979)was a Chilean football attacker. He played in the 1930 World Cup and in the Chilean league in Audax Italiano.

References

External links

Chilean footballers
1903 births
1979 deaths
Chile international footballers
Chilean Primera División players
Audax Italiano footballers
1930 FIFA World Cup players
Year of death missing
Association football forwards